The Pat Bayle State Forest is a state forest located near the town of Grand Marais in Cook County, Minnesota. The forest falls within the limits of the Superior National Forest, and falls under the federal jurisdiction of the United States Forest Service. 

Within the forest one can find the highest point of elevation in the state of Minnesota, Eagle Mountain. In addition to hiking, winter outdoor recreational activities are popular, including snowmobiling, snowshoeing, dog sledding, and ice-fishing.

See also
List of Minnesota state forests

External links
Pat Bayle State Forest - Minnesota Department of Natural Resources (DNR)

References

Minnesota state forests
Protected areas of Cook County, Minnesota
Protected areas established in 1963